Nikolay Tikhomirov (21 December 1930 – 1987) was a Soviet long-distance runner. He competed in the marathon at the 1964 Summer Olympics.

References

1930 births
1987 deaths
Athletes (track and field) at the 1964 Summer Olympics
Soviet male long-distance runners
Soviet male marathon runners
Olympic athletes of the Soviet Union